Ustyanovo may refer to:
Ustyanovo, Moscow Oblast, a village in Moscow Oblast, Russia
Ustyanovo, Vologda Oblast, a village (selo) in Vologda Oblast, Russia